Adanuru or Adnooru (also referred to as Aadanooru in local Kannada language) is a village in Holalkere taluk of Chitradurga district in the Karnataka state of Southern India. It is situated around 5 kilometers from Holalkere on Holalkere - Davanagere state highway (SH-19).

In the local Dravidian language, the name translates to 'Aadina' + 'Ooru' viz. Village of Rams.  As with other villages in the vicinity, this signifies the tribal roots of the region.

References

Villages in Chitradurga district